Rhizophora is a genus of tropical mangrove trees, sometimes collectively called true mangroves. The most notable species is the red mangrove (Rhizophora mangle) but some other species and a few natural hybrids are known. Rhizophora species generally live in intertidal zones which are inundated daily by the ocean. They exhibit a number of adaptations to this environment, including pneutomatophores that elevate the plants above the water and allow them to respire oxygen even while their lower roots are submerged and a cytological molecular "pump" mechanism that allows them to remove excess salts from their cells. The generic name is derived from the Greek words ριζα (rhiza), meaning "root," and φορος (phoros), meaning "bearing," referring to the stilt-roots.

The beetle Poecilips fallax is a common pest of these trees, especially Rhizophora mucronata and Rhizophora apiculata. This beetle (related to carver beetles) lays its eggs in the hypocotyls. When they hatch, the larvae dig tunnels through the hypocotyl, distorting its shape, When the beetle pupates it leaves the plant, but the hypocotyl will no longer be able to develop normally.

The red mangrove is the state tree of Delta Amacuro in Venezuela; a dark brown dye can be produced from it, which is used in Tongan ngatu cloth production.

Species

Hybrids
 Rhizophora × annamalayana Kathiresan (R. apiculata × R. mucronata)
 Rhizophora × lamarckii Montrouz. (R. apiculata × R. stylosa)
 Rhizophora × selala (Salvoza) P.B.Tomlinson (R. mangle × R. stylosa)

Formerly placed here
 Aegiceras corniculatum (L.) Blanco (as R. corniculata L.)
 Bruguiera gymnorhiza (L.) Savigny (as R. gymnorhiza L.)
 Bruguiera parviflora (Roxb.) Wight & Arn. ex Griff. (as R. parviflora Roxb.)
 Bruguiera sexangula (Lour.) Poir. (as R. sexangula Lour.)
 Ceriops tagal (Perr.) C.B.Rob. (as R. tagal Perr.)

See also
Changes in global mangrove distributions
Ecological values of mangrove

References

External links

 
Malpighiales genera
Mangroves